is a high school located in Bifuka, Nakagawa (Teshio) District, Kamikawa Subprefecture, Hokkaido, Japan. It was established as the Bifuka Branch School of Hokkaido Nayoro Agricultural High School in 1948 before changing to its current name in 1952 after becoming independent of Hokkaido Nayoro Agricultural High School.

Notable alumni
Keibun Ōta, painter and illustrator

Educational institutions established in 1948
High schools in Hokkaido
1948 establishments in Japan